The Kershaw Ice Rumples are a large area of disturbed ice between Fletcher Ice Rise and Korff Ice Rise, in the southwestern part of the Ronne Ice Shelf, Antarctica. The feature appears in U.S. Navy aerial photographs taken in the 1960s and in imagery obtained by the NASA Earth Resources Technology Satellite (ERTS-1), 1973–74. It was named by the UK Antarctic Place-Names Committee for John E.G. Kershaw, a senior pilot with the British Antarctic Survey, 1974–75.

References

Filchner-Ronne Ice Shelf
Ice rises of Queen Elizabeth Land